was a town located in Higashiiwai District, Iwate Prefecture, Japan.

Daitō village was created on April 1, 1889 within Higashiiwai District with the establishment of the municipality system. It was raised to town status on March 21, 1903. On April 1, 1955 it annexed the neighboring towns of Surisawa and Ohara, and the villages of Okita, Sarusawa and Shinutami.

On September 20, 2005, Daitō, along with the towns of Higashiyama and Senmaya, the villages of Kawasaki and Murone (all from Higashiiwai District), and the town of Hanaizumi (from Nishiiwai District), was merged into the expanded city of Ichinoseki and no longer exists as an independent municipality.

As of September 2005, the town had an estimated population of 16,655 and a population density of 59.86 persons per km2. The total area was 278.21 km2.

External links
Official website 

Dissolved municipalities of Iwate Prefecture
Ichinoseki, Iwate